The Santa Anita Sprint Championship is a Grade II American Thoroughbred horse race for horses aged three years old or older over the distance of six furlongs on the dirt scheduled annually in September at Santa Anita Park in Arcadia, California.  The event currently carries a purse of $200,000.

History

The race was originally named in honor of the California-bred horse Ancient Title, a two-time California Horse of the Year and a National Museum of Racing and Hall of Fame inductee.  The inaugural running of the event was at Hollywood Park as an overnight stakes event for three year olds on 23 December 1983 over a distance of  miles. The following year the distance of the event was shortened to 1 mile. In 1985 the event was moved to the  Oak Tree Racing Association meeting at Santa Anita Park as a sprint for horses three-year-olds and older over six furlongs.

In 1990 the event was classified by the American Graded Stakes Committee as Grade III and was upgraded to Grade II status in 1999. In 2001 the event was upgraded to Grade I.

In 2012 the event was renamed to the Santa Anita Sprint Championship.

Between 1990 and 2006, the Breeders' Cup sponsored the event which reflected in the name of the event.
The event is part of the Breeders' Cup Challenge series, the winner of the race automatically qualifies for the Breeders' Cup Sprint.

As of 2020 the race was downgraded to Grade II.

Records
Time record: 
 1:07.53 - Cost of Freedom (2008)

Margins:
4 lengths – Sam Who (1989)

Most wins:
 2 - Roy H (2017, 2018)

Most wins by an owner:
 2 - J. Paul Reddam (2001, 2004)

Most wins by a jockey:
 4 - Ed Delahoussaye (1990, 1993, 1996, 2001)
 4 - Kent J. Desormeaux (1992, 1998, 1999, 2017)
 4 - Mike E. Smith (2011, 2013, 2019, 2022)

Most wins by a trainer:
 4 - John W. Sadler (1988, 1991, 1995, 2008)

Winners 

Legend:

 
 

Notes:

§ Ran as an entry

See also
 List of American and Canadian Graded races

References

Open sprint category horse races
1983 establishments in California
Grade 1 stakes races in the United States
Recurring sporting events established in 1983
Breeders' Cup Challenge series
Santa Anita Park
Horse races in California